Marián Masný (born 13 August 1950 in Rybany) is a Slovak former football player. He played for Czechoslovakia, for which he played 75 matches and scored 18 goals. His brother Vojtech was also football player.

He was a participant at the 1976 UEFA European Championship, where Czechoslovakia won the gold medal, and at the 1980 UEFA European Championship where they came third and at the 1982 FIFA World Cup.

Masný started out at amateur football clubs Jednota Trenčin and then Dukla Banska Bystrica before joining professional team played Slovan Bratislava. He played most of his career for Slovan Bratislava from 1968 to 1989 and also played briefly for Petržalka before he retired in 1990.

Kevin Keegan described Masný as "one of the world's most skilful wingers". Masný created two goals in a three-minute spell against Keegan's England squad in a European championship match in Bratislava, 1975.

Honours 

 Czechoslovak First League Winners (2): 1974 & 1975.
 Slovenský Pohár Winners (6): 1972, 1974, 1976, 1982, & 1983.
 Czechoslovak Cup Winners (2): 1974 & 1982.
 Ciutat de Barcelona Trophy Winner (1): 1974.
 UEFA Euro Winner (1): 1976.

References 
 
 Voted in top 10 World Player of the Year
 Voted in top 20 World Player of the Year
 Caps and Goals National Team
 Marián Masný Profile
 Voted into Slovak Team of the Century

1950 births
Slovak footballers
Czechoslovak footballers
UEFA Euro 1976 players
UEFA Euro 1980 players
1982 FIFA World Cup players
Living people
Czechoslovakia international footballers
ŠK Slovan Bratislava players
Czechoslovak expatriate footballers
Expatriate footballers in Austria
Czechoslovak expatriate sportspeople in Austria
Association football midfielders
UEFA European Championship-winning players
FK Dukla Banská Bystrica players